Giulio Verocai (born 31 March 1942) is an Italian ice hockey player. He competed in the men's tournament at the 1964 Winter Olympics.

References

External links
 

1942 births
Living people
Olympic ice hockey players of Italy
Ice hockey players at the 1964 Winter Olympics
People from Cortina d'Ampezzo
Sportspeople from the Province of Belluno